Blåkampen is a mountain in Vang Municipality in Innlandet county, Norway. The mountain is surrounded by several other notable mountains including Gilafjellet to the north, Veslebotnskarvet and Skogshorn to the south, and Ranastongi and Klanten to the northwest. The lower elevations of the eastern side of the mountain extend into the neighboring Vestre Slidre Municipality.

See also
List of mountains of Norway by height

References

Vang, Innlandet
Mountains of Innlandet